Buxton is an unincorporated community and census-designated place (CDP) on Hatteras Island (part of the Outer Banks) near Cape Hatteras. It is located in Dare County in the U.S. state of North Carolina. As of the 2010 census, it had a population of 1,273.  Located at the widest part of Hatteras Island, it is the largest community on Hatteras Island both in terms of area and population, and is home to the island's schools and other major public buildings and offices.

North Carolina Highway 12 links the community to other Outer Banks communities such as Avon, Frisco, and Hatteras. Buxton is most famous for being the location of Cape Hatteras Light and of the accompanied beaches; it is also the home of the Cape Hatteras Anglers Club.

The residents of Buxton are governed by the Dare County Board of Commissioners.  Buxton is part of District 4, along with Avon, Frisco, Hatteras, Rodanthe, Waves and Salvo.

In addition to Cape Hatteras Light, the  shipwreck was listed on the National Register of Historic Places in 2013.

Demographics

2020 census

As of the 2020 United States census, there were 1,181 people, 572 households, and 405 families residing in the CDP.

Recreation

Watersports are common on both the Pamlico Sound side and the Atlantic Ocean side of the community. Proximity to the convergence of the Labrador Current and the Gulf Stream result in some of the largest surf available  on the East Coast. On the protected soundside of the island, watersports such as windsurfing, kayaking, kiteboarding, and swimming are all readily available and accessible.

Education

Residents are served by the new Cape Hatteras Elementary School, opened in 2001 (home of the Tropical Storms) and Cape Hatteras Secondary School of Coastal Studies, a combination middle school and high school (Home of the Hurricanes) newly rebuilt in 2007 on the NC 12 site of the original Cape Hatteras Elementary  and Cape Hatteras Secondary Schools, in Buxton. Both schools are part of the Dare County Schools district.

British Cemetery
On May 21, 1942, the body of a British seaman, unidentifiable but presumed to be from the HMT Bedfordshire, sunk by a German U-boat, washed ashore. The month prior, a British sailor from the sunken merchant ship San Delfino had been buried in Buxton. The Bedfordshire seaman was interred in an adjacent plot, resulting in a British Cemetery, formally known as Cape Hatteras Coast Guard Burial Ground.

Climate

According to the Trewartha climate classification system, Buxton, North Carolina has a humid subtropical climate with hot and humid summers, cool winters and year-around precipitation (Cfak). Cfak climates are characterized by all months having an average mean temperature > 32.0 °F (> 0.0 °C), at least eight months with an average mean temperature ≥ 50.0 °F (≥ 10.0 °C), at least one month with an average mean temperature ≥ 71.6 °F (≥ 22.0 °C) and no significant precipitation difference between seasons. During the summer months in Buxton, a cooling afternoon sea breeze is present on most days, but episodes of extreme heat and humidity can occur with heat index values ≥ 100 °F (≥ 38 °C). Buxton is prone to hurricane strikes, particularly during the Atlantic hurricane season which extends from June 1 through November 30, sharply peaking from late August through September. During the winter months, episodes of cold and wind can occur with wind chill values < 15 °F (< -9 °C). The plant hardiness zone in Buxton is 8b with an average annual extreme minimum air temperature of 19.3 °F (-7.1 °C). The average seasonal (Dec-Mar) snowfall total is < 2 inches (< 5 cm), and the average annual peak in nor'easter activity is in February.

Ecology

According to the A. W. Kuchler U.S. potential natural vegetation types, Buxton, North Carolina would have a dominant vegetation type of Live oak/Sea Oats Uniola paniculata (90) with a dominant vegetation form of Coastal Prairie (20).

References

Census-designated places in North Carolina
Census-designated places in Dare County, North Carolina
Hatteras Island
Beaches of North Carolina
Beaches of Dare County, North Carolina
Populated coastal places in North Carolina